World Basketball League (WBL) was a minor professional basketball league in the United States and Canada that ran from 1988 to 1992. It was founded as the International Basketball Association in November 1987, before changing its name prior to the 1988 season.  One of the major differences between it and other leagues was that it had a height restriction.  Players over 6 ft 5 in (1.95 m) were not allowed to play; this restriction was raised to 6 ft 7 in (2.0 m) in 1991.  

Basketball Hall-of-Famer and Boston Celtic great Bob Cousy (6'1" tall) was one of the league's founders. Norm Drucker, a 25-year veteran referee with the National Basketball Association and American Basketball Association, and a former supervisor of officials for the NBA, served as the WBL's supervisor of officiating. One of the league's founders, Michael Monus, was eventually convicted of having embezzled $10 million to finance the league, from a privately owned company he had founded, Phar-Mor.  He was sentenced to nine (9) years in federal prison.

In addition to games against other teams in the league, games were also played against international teams. The league had several of its games broadcast on television. In Canada, the games were broadcast on the CanWest Global System. In the United States, the games were broadcast on SportsChannel America. Mike Rice was the primary analyst for the SportsChannel broadcasts.

After the league folded in 1992, the surviving Canadian-based teams formed the National Basketball League.  This league played two seasons before it folded as well.

Teams

International Teams

Champions of WBL
1988 Las Vegas Silver Streaks 102 Chicago Express 95 (one-game playoff)
1989 Youngstown Pride won best of three series two games to none over Calgary 88's
1990 Youngstown Pride won best of five championship series three games to two over the Calgary 88's
1991 Dayton Wings won best of five championship series three games to none over the Calgary 88's
1992 Dayton Wings declared champions as leaders of regular season (due to league folding on August 1)

Awards

WBL Championship MVP
1988: Jamie Waller, Las Vegas Silver Streaks
1989: Barry Mitchell, Youngstown Pride
1990: Barry Mitchell, Youngstown Pride
1991: Perry McDonald, Dayton Wings

Player of the Year
This award was established in 1991.
1991: Tracy Moore, Florida Jades

Rookie of the Year
This award was established in 1991.
1991: J. J. Eubanks, Nashville Stars

Sixth Man of the Year
1988: Chip Engelland, Calgary 88s
1989: Keith Smart, Worcester Counts
1990: Troy Lewis, Youngstown Pride
1991: Kelsey Weems, Calgary 88s

Coach of the Year
1988: Mike Thibault, Calgary 88s
1989: Bob Patton, Youngstown Pride
1990: Sonny Allen, Las Vegas Silver Streaks
1991: Pat Haley, Dayton Wings

Statistical leaders

Notable players

NBA players 
These players played at least 1 game in the NBA

Vincent Askew
Dudley Bradley
Scott Brooks
Carlos Clark
Fred Cofield
Mario Elie
David Henderson
Alfredrick Hughes
Cedric Hunter
Darryl Johnson
Anthony Jones
Doug Lee
Tim Legler
Jim Les
Sidney Lowe
Kenny Natt
Craig Neal
Jose Slaughter
Keith Smart
John Starks
Jim Thomas
Andre Turner
Mark Wade
Milt Wagner
Jamie Waller
Perry Young

Other leagues 
These players have won at least 1 individual award while playing in professional leagues
Joe Dawson
Aivar Kuusmaa
Darryl McDonald
Igors Miglinieks
Barry Mitchell
Clyde Vaughan

References

External links
History of the league

SportsChannel
Defunct basketball leagues in the United States
Basketball leagues in Canada